
Gmina Karczew is an urban-rural gmina (administrative district) in Otwock County, Masovian Voivodeship, in east-central Poland.

The gmina contains part of the protected area called Masovian Landscape Park.

Villages
Apart from the town of Karczew, Gmina Karczew contains the villages and settlements of Brzezinka, Całowanie, Glinki, Janów, Kępa Nadbrzeska, Kosumce, Łukówiec, Nadbrzeż, Ostrówek, Ostrówiec, Otwock Mały, Otwock Wielki, Piotrowice, Sobiekursk, Władysławów and Wygoda.

Neighbouring gminas
Gmina Karczew is bordered by the town of Otwock and by the gminas of Celestynów, Góra Kalwaria, Konstancin-Jeziorna, Sobienie-Jeziory and Wiązowna.

References
Polish official population figures 2006

Karczew
Otwock County